The Basketball Tournament 2017 was the fourth edition of The Basketball Tournament, a 5-on-5, single elimination basketball tournament broadcast by the ESPN family of networks. The tournament involved 64 teams; it started on July 8 and continued through August 3, 2017. The winner of the final, Overseas Elite, received a two million dollar prize.

Format
The main tournament field consisted of 64 teams, organized into four regions of 16 teams each. The sixteen teams in each region were nine teams selected by fans via the tournament's website, six teams selected at-large, and one team selected via a play-in "Jamboree". The Jamboree consisted of 16 teams, each of which paid a $5000 entry fee. After two rounds of play, the surviving four teams advanced to the main field of 64 (one per region), and were refunded their entry fees. Jamboree games used an experimental "Mensa Rules" ending, now known as the Elam Ending.

The winning team (its players, coaches, general manager, and boosters) received 90% of the $2 million prize, while the remaining 10% was split amongst the team's top 100 fans (based on points earned online).

Venues
The Basketball Tournament 2017 took place in six locations; all play-in ("Jamboree") games were held in Philadelphia.

Red dots mark regional locations, the blue dot marks the Super 16 location, and the green dot marks the semifinal and finals location.

Alumni Teams

Multiple teams in the tournament were composed mostly or exclusively of alumni of a particular school. These teams are listed below.

Bracket
All times Eastern.

Northeast Region – Philadelphia, PA

Northeast Regional final

Midwest Region – Peoria, IL

Midwest Regional final

South Region – Charlotte, NC

South Regional final

West Region – Las Vegas, NV

West Regional final

National semifinals – Baltimore, MD

Semifinals

National championship

Awards

 Marshall was both a player and the general manager for Team Challenge ALS
Source:

References

External links
 2017 TBT Championship Recap - #6 Team Challenge ALS vs #1 Overseas Elite via YouTube
 2017 TBT Semifinals Recap - #6 Team Challenge ALS vs #2 Scarlet & Gray via YouTube
 2017 TBT Semifinals Recap - #1 Overseas Elite vs #3 Boeheim's Army via YouTube

The Basketball Tournament
2017–18 in American basketball
2017 in sports in California
2017 in sports in Illinois
2017 in sports in Maryland
2017 in sports in Nevada
2017 in sports in New York City
2017 in sports in North Carolina
2017 in sports in Pennsylvania
2010s in Baltimore
21st century in Las Vegas
2017 in Los Angeles
2017 in Philadelphia
2010s in Brooklyn
July 2017 sports events in the United States
August 2017 sports events in the United States
Basketball competitions in New York City
Downtown Brooklyn
Basketball competitions in Baltimore
Basketball competitions in Charlotte, North Carolina
Basketball competitions in Illinois
Basketball competitions in Philadelphia
Sports in Peoria, Illinois
Basketball competitions in Las Vegas